1973 in sports describes the year's events in world sport.

Alpine skiing
 Alpine Skiing World Cup
 Men's overall season champion: Gustav Thöni, Italy
 Women's overall season champion: Annemarie Pröll, Austria

American football
 January 14 − Super Bowl VII: the Miami Dolphins (AFC) won 14–7 over the Washington Redskins (NFC) to complete the only perfect (unbeaten and untied) season in the history of the NFL
 Location: Los Angeles Memorial Coliseum
 Attendance: 90,182	
 MVP: Jake Scott, FS (Miami)
 Rose Bowl (1972 season):
 The Southern California Trojans won 42–17 over the Ohio State Buckeyes to win college football national championship
 O. J. Simpson becomes the first player in NFL history to rush for more than 2,000 yards in a single season.
its verry importent for to play foetbal

Association football
 Brazil – Palmeiras wins the Campeonato Brasileiro
 England – FA Cup – Sunderland wins 1–0 over Leeds United
 1 January 1973, Edinburgh, Scotland, Edinburgh Derby between Hearts and Hibernian played at Tynecastle ends in a 7–0 victory for Hibernian.
Philadelphia Atoms defeat Toronto Metros to win the North American Soccer League championship in their inaugural season.

Australian rules football
 Victorian Football League
 Richmond wins the 77th VFL Premiership defeating Carlton 16.20 (116) to 12.14 (86) in the Grand Final.
 Brownlow Medal awarded to Keith Greig (North Melbourne)
 South Australian National Football League:
 1 September: South Adelaide kick only 1.4 (10) against Sturt's 14.24 (108) in the rain at Unley Oval, with the Panthers’ sole goal being the first score of the match after five minutes. It was the lowest score in the SA(N)FL between 1914 and 2003.
 29 September: Glenelg 21.11 (137) defeat North Adelaide 19.16 (130) for their second SANFL premiership in what is often regarded as the great-ever SANFL Grand Final
 Western Australian National Football League
 29 September: Subiaco break the longest premiership drought in WANFL history, beating West Perth 10.12 (72) to 6.4 (40) for their first premiership since 1924.

Bandy

Baseball
 18 January – Orlando Cepeda signs with the Boston Red Sox, making him the first player signed by a team specifically to be a designated hitter.
 The American League uses the designated hitter rule for the first time.  Ron Blomberg is the first player to bat as a DH.
 World Series – Oakland Athletics won 4 games to 3 over the New York Mets

Basketball
 NCAA Division I Men's Basketball Championship –
 UCLA wins 87–66 over Memphis State. Bill Walton of UCLA scored 44 points in the Championship game.
 NBA Finals –
 New York Knicks won 4 games to 1 over the Los Angeles Lakers
 ABA Finals –
 Indiana Pacers defeat Kentucky Colonels, 4 games to 3

Boxing
 22 January – George Foreman beats Joe Frazier by a knockout in two rounds to lift the world's Heavyweight championship from Frazier. It is HBO Boxing's first telecast.

Canadian football
 Grey Cup – Ottawa Rough Riders win 22–18 over the Edmonton Eskimos
 Vanier Cup – St. Mary's Huskies win 14–6 over the McGill Redmen

Cycling
 Tour de France – Luis Ocaña of Spain
 UCI Road World Championships – Men's road race – Felice Gimondi, of Italy

Dogsled racing
 Iditarod Trail Sled Dog Race Champion –
 Dick Wilmarth won with lead dog: Hotfoot

Field hockey
 Men's World Cup in Amstelveen, Netherlands won by the Netherlands

Figure skating
 World Figure Skating Championships –
 Men's champion: Ondrej Nepela, Czechoslovakia
 Ladies' champion: Karen Magnussen, Canada
 Pair skating champions: Irina Rodnina & Alexander Zaitsev, Soviet Union
 Ice dancing champions: Lyudmila Pakhomova & Alexandr Gorshkov, Soviet Union

Golf
Men's professional
 Masters Tournament – Tommy Aaron
 U.S. Open – Johnny Miller – Miller's final round of 63 was a new major championship record which has been equaled several times since, it wasn't until 2017 when that record was broken by Branden Grace at The Open Championship when he shot a 62.
 British Open – Tom Weiskopf
 PGA Championship – Jack Nicklaus
 PGA Tour money leader – Jack Nicklaus – $308,362
 Ryder Cup – United States won 19–13 over Great Britain & Ireland in team golf.
Men's amateur
 British Amateur – Dick Siderowf
 U.S. Amateur – Craig Stadler
Women's professional
 LPGA Championship – Mary Mills
 U.S. Women's Open – Susie Berning
 LPGA Tour money leader – Kathy Whitworth – $82,864

Harness racing
 United States Pacing Triple Crown races –
 Cane Pace – Smog
 Little Brown Jug – Melvin's Woe
 Messenger Stakes – Valiant Bret
 United States Trotting Triple Crown races –
 Hambletonian – Flirth
 Yonkers Trot – Tamerlane
 Kentucky Futurity – Arnie Almahurst
 Australian Inter Dominion Harness Racing Championship –
 Pacers: Hondo Grattan
 Trotters: Precocious

Horse racing
 Secretariat, ridden by jockey Ron Turcotte, becomes the first horse in 25 years to win all three United States Triple Crown Races
Steeplechases
 Cheltenham Gold Cup – The Dikler
 Grand National – Red Rum
Flat races
 Australia – Melbourne Cup – Gala Supreme
 Canada – Queen's Plate – Royal Chocolate
 France – Prix de l'Arc de Triomphe – Rheingold
 Ireland – Irish Derby Stakes – Weavers' Hall
 English Triple Crown Races:
 2,000 Guineas Stakes – Mon Fils
 The Derby – Morston
 St. Leger Stakes – Peleid
 United States Triple Crown Races:
 Kentucky Derby – Secretariat
 Preakness Stakes – Secretariat
 Belmont Stakes – Secretariat

Ice hockey
 Art Ross Trophy as the NHL's leading scorer during the regular season: Phil Esposito, Boston Bruins
 Hart Memorial Trophy for the NHL's Most Valuable Player: Bobby Clarke – Philadelphia Flyers
 Stanley Cup – Montreal Canadiens defeat the Chicago Blackhawks 4 games to 2
 World Hockey Association 
 AVCO Cup – New England Whalers defeat the Winnipeg Jets 4 games to 1 for first league championship.
 World Hockey Championship –
 Men's champion: Soviet Union defeated Sweden
 NCAA Men's Ice Hockey Championship – University of Wisconsin–Madison Badgers defeat University of Denver Pioneers 4–2 in Boston

Lacrosse
 NCAA Division I Men's Championship – University of Maryland Terrapins defeated Johns Hopkins University Bluejays 10–9 in 2 overtimes.

Motorsport

Radiosport
 Seventh Amateur Radio Direction Finding European Championship held in Komló, Hungary.
 First ARRL 10 Meter Contest held in December.

Rugby league
Captain Morgan Trophy
1973 New Zealand rugby league season
1973 NSWRFL season
1972–73 Northern Rugby Football League season / 1973–74 Northern Rugby Football League season

Rugby union
 79th Five Nations Championship series is a five-way tie with all teams winning two matches each

Snooker
 World Snooker Championship – Ray Reardon beats Eddie Charlton 38–32

Swimming
 The first FINA World Championships held in Belgrade, Yugoslavia

Tennis
 Grand Slam in tennis men's results:
 Australian Open – John Newcombe
 French Open – Ilie Năstase
 Wimbledon – Jan Kodeš
 US Open – John Newcombe
 Grand Slam in tennis women's results:
 Australian Open – Margaret Court
 French Open – Margaret Court
 Wimbledon – Billie Jean King
 US Open – Margaret Court
 Davis Cup – Australia wins 5–0 over the United States in world tennis.
 Men and women players receive equal prize money at the US Open
 20 September – In the famed Battle of the sexes at Houston's Astrodome – Billie Jean King beat Bobby Riggs in 3straight sets.

Water polo
 1973 FINA Men's World Water Polo Championship held in Belgrade and won by Hungary

General sporting events
 Second All-Africa Games held in Lagos, Nigeria
 Seventh Summer Universiade held in Moscow, Soviet Union

Awards
 Associated Press Male Athlete of the Year – O. J. Simpson, National Football League
 Associated Press Female Athlete of the Year – Billie Jean King, Tennis

References

 
Sports by year